The warrior catfish (Hemiarius dioctes) is a species of catfish in the family Ariidae. It was described by Patricia J. Kailola in 2000, originally under the genus Arius. It inhabits marine and freshwaters in New Guinea and Australia.

The species epithet "dioctes", derived from Ancient Greek, refers to the species' hunting qualities.

References

Ariidae
Fish described in 2000